Renaudin was one of six s built for the French Navy during the early 1910s. Completed in 1913, the ship was assigned to the 1st Naval Army in the Mediterranean Sea. During the First World War, she escorted the battle fleet during the Battle of Antivari in August 1914 and escorted multiple convoys to Montenegro for the rest of the year. Renaudin helped to sink a crippled Austro-Hungarian destroyer during the 1st Battle of Durazzo in late 1915 and protected the evacuation of the Royal Serbian Army from Durazzo, Albania, in February 1916. The ship was sunk by an Austro-Hungarian submarine the following month with the loss of 50 crewmen.

Design and description
The Bisson class were slightly enlarged versions of the preceding . They displaced  at normal load. Their crew numbered 4 officers and 77–84 men.

Renaudin was powered by a pair of Breguet steam turbines, each driving one propeller shaft using steam provided by four Guyot-du Temple water-tube boilers.

The primary armament of the Bisson-class ships consisted of two  Modèle 1893 guns in single mounts, one each fore and aft of the superstructure, and four  Modèle 1902 guns distributed amidships. They were also fitted with two twin mounts for  torpedo tubes amidships, one on each broadside.

Construction and career
Renaudin was ordered on 23 November 1910 as part of the 1910 naval program from the Arsenal de Toulon and was laid down on 1 February 1911. She was launched on 20 March 1913 and began her sea trials on 10 July. The ship was commissioned on 1 January 1914 and was assigned to the 6th Destroyer Flotilla of the 1st Naval Army in the Mediterranean. Shortly after the beginning of the First World War, the flotilla escorted the battle fleet during the Battle of Antivari on 16 August and when they bombarded the Austro-Hungarian naval base at Cattaro on 1 September. Four days later, the fleet covered the evacuation of Danilo, Crown Prince of Montenegro to the Greek island of Corfu. The flotilla escorted multiple small convoys loaded with supplies and equipment to Antivari, Montenegro, for the rest of the year, always covered by the larger ships of the Naval Army in futile attempts to lure the Austro-Hungarian fleet into battle. The first convoy of 1915 to Antivari arrived on 11 January and was followed by another later in the month. Renaudin was under repair from 1 February to 25 March.

After Italy signed the Treaty of London and declared war on the Austro-Hungarian Empire on 23 May, the ship was transferred to the 1st Destroyer Flotilla in December which was assigned to the 1st Division of Destroyers and Submarines of the 2nd Squadron based at Brindisi, Italy. Several weeks later, Captain A. P. Addison's force (the British light cruiser , the Italian scout cruiser  and the 1st Destroyer Flotilla) was alerted by a report of an Austro-Hungarian cruiser and five destroyers off Durazzo, shortly before 0700 on 29 December and sortied at 0715 in an attempt to cut off the Austro-Hungarian ships from their base at Cattaro. While attacking the ships in the harbor, the s had blundered into a minefield which sank one ship and crippled .

Initially unaware of the losses suffered by the Austro-Hungarians, Addison had sailed directly for Cattaro, but when he was informed of the losses, he turned south, searching for the Austro-Hungarians. Smoke on the southern horizon was spotted at 1320, although Addison's ships had been seen five minutes earlier earlier by the Austro-Hungarians; the tow had been dropped and Triglav abandoned. At 1338 Addison detached his destroyers to deal with Triglav which still had smoke coming from its funnels. The flotilla commander aboard  thought that the Austro-Hungarian ship was still underway and decided to engage it with gunfire rather than torpedoing it. The time required to sink Triglav was longer than expected and left the flotilla unable to rejoin the pursuit despite following Addison's cruisers at full speed.

The flotilla covered the evacuation of the Royal Serbian Army from Durrazo on 23–26 February 1916. One torpedo struck Renaudin, breaking her in half, and another missed Commandant Bory. The latter ship was able to rescue 30 survivors from Renaudins crew of 80 after the submarine disengaged.

References

Bibliography

 
 

Bisson-class destroyers
Ships built in France
1913 ships
Maritime incidents in 1916
Ships sunk by Austro-Hungarian submarines
World War I shipwrecks in the Adriatic Sea